Droṇa, also referred to as Dronacharya, is a major character of the Hindu epic Mahabharata. 

In the epic, he serves as the royal preceptor of the Kauravas and the Pandavas. He is one of the primary counsellors and warriors featured in the epic. He is a friend of Sukracharya, the guru of the asuras, as well as Mahabali. He is described to be the son of the sage Bharadvaja, and a descendant of the sage Angirasa. The preceptor is a master of advanced military arts, including the divine weapons known as astras. He serves as the second commander-in-chief of the Kaurava army, from the 11th day to the 15th day. The acharya fails four times in capturing Yudhishthira (The 11th day, 12th day, 14th day, and the 14th night). He is beheaded by Dhrishtadyumna when he meditates to release his soul on the battlefield. It is said that Drona is an incarnation of Shukracharya. He is guru to the Pandavas, Kauravas, Jayadratha, and Ashwatthama, his son.

Etymology
Drona’s name means Vessel or Bucket or Quiver. He had many other names. Some of his names are-
Dronacharya (द्रोणाचार्य) - Teacher Drona
Bharadwajputra (भार्दवाजपुत्र) - Son of Bharadwaja
Parshuramashishya (परशुरामशिष्य) - Disciple of Parashurama

Birth and early life
On a river side, Sage Bharadwaja saw an apsara named Ghritachi. He was filled with desire and his seed fell into a pot or basket. Inside it, a child developed who was named Drona because he was born in a pot and was brought to the ashram.

In Sage Bharadwaja's ashram, his son Drona and Prince Drupada were educated. Drona and Drupada became best friends, and Drupada promised to help Drona whenever he needed him. Time passed, and Drupada became the king of Panchala, and Drona became a sage and teacher. Drona had a son named Ashwatthama. Drona was not interested in material wealth and became poor.

Drona's Insult
Once, Drona's son Ashwatthama was playing with his friends. His friends were drinking milk and he wanted to drink it too. But his friends mixed flour with water and gave it to him. This enraged Drona and he remembered Drupada's promise. He went to Drupada's palace and asked him only to provide a cow for providing milk to his son. But Drupada, having grown vain, refused. He also insulted Drona by asking how a beggar could be his friend. This outraged Drona and he wanted revenge.

Teaching the Kuru Princes

Drona along with Kripa was brought by Bhishma for the education of the Kuru princes . As a reward, Drona gave Arjuna mantras to invoke the super-powerful divine weapon of Brahma known as Brahmashirshastra, but told Arjuna not to use this invincible weapon against any mortal.

When Arjun, inspired by his brother Bhima's nocturnal eating, mastered archery in absolute darkness, Drona was moved. Drona was greatly impressed by Arjuna's concentration, determination, and drive, and promised him that he would become the greatest archer on earth. Drona gave Arjuna the special knowledge of the Dhanurveda due to his capability and zeal to learn the new things.

Education in Archery of the Kauravas and Reward

Ekalavya

Ekalavya, the son of a Nishadha chief, approached Dronacharya seeking his instruction. But since his father was a general under Jarasandh, the ruler of Magadha (an enemy state), Dronacharya refused to train him alongside Kauravas and Panadavas. Undeterred, Ekalavya began study and practice by himself, having fashioned a clay idol of Dronacharya's to watch over his training. Solely by his determination, Ekalavya became an archer of exceptional skill. 

One day, Ekalavya's focus in training was disturbed by the barking of a dog belonging to the Kuru princes. Ekalavya fired arrows that filled up the dog's mouth without spilling blood or causing injury to the dog. The Kuru princes were amazed by the trick and looked for the archer when they saw Ekalavya, who introduced himself as a pupil of Drona's. This made Arjuna amused and quite sad about Ekalavya's archery skills as he said that he learnt indirectly from the same guru Drona that Arjuna was learning. Drona was in a tangle: on the one hand, he greatly admired Ekalavya's skill and dedication; on the other hand, Ekalavya had indeed been training as his pupil without his consent, albeit being guided only by his idol. To resolve the matter, Drona accepted Ekalavya as his student, but demanded the thumb on his dominant hand as gurudakshina, or teacher's payment, in order to limit his abilities and further growth in archery, thus pacifying Arjuna. Ekalavya, being an exemplary disciple, immediately cut off his thumb and presented it at Drona's feet. Moved by Ekalavya's sacrifice, Drona blessed him to attain mastery even without his thumb.

Demonstration by the pupils 
Dhritarashtra approved the demonstration of weapon-game by the princes. An arena was prepared. Drona entered the arena. Drona worshiped the gods as a form of preparatory rites. Then he invited the brahmins to bless his disciples. After that the students gave gold, precious stones, clothes and other valuables to the teacher. The teacher blessed him. With this the demonstration started. Bhima and Duryodhana showed their skills in gaddha yudha by fighting with each other. The mock fight turned into a serious fight. Drona sent Ashwatthama to stop the fight because seeing this the citizens may get triggered by their fight. Then, Arjuna entered the hall with much appreciation and praises from the citizen of Hastinapura. He showed various archery skills to the people. Drona impressed by his beloved student Arjuna's skills then declared that Arjuna is the greatest archer in the world. Then, Karna gatecrashed and entered the arena and surpassed everyone's expectations and performances with the Permission of Drona. He then challenged Arjuna for a duel, Drona and Kripa started making excuses by questioning his lineage. Karna could not answer as he do not know who are his real parents. Duryodhana then made Karna the king of Anga. Then sunset occurred and the duel of Karna and Arjuna was stopped.

Drona's Revenge

After Drona completed the formal training of the Kuru princes, he demanded that they invade Panchala and bring him Drupada as their Gurudakshina. Arjuna succeeds in defeating Drupada and brings the captured king to Drona. Drona reminds Drupada about their days of friendship and his false promise before taking away half of the Panchala kingdom. Drona would make Ashwatthama the king of the annexed half of the Panchala kingdom. This action would lead Drupada to perform a sacrificial yagna in order to beget a son who would kill Drona. The sages Upayaja and Yaja helped him to beget such a son Dhrishtadyumna. The sacrificial fire also yielded a daughter, Draupadi.

Weapons of Drona
Droṇa received the Brahmastra from Parashurama. Parashurama imparted knowledge of celestial weapons to Drona along with the mantra of invocation and withdrawal of weapons. He had a huge range of weapons like Brahmastra, Brahmashira, Narayanastra, Rudra, Agneya, Vajra etc. Drona held the invincible sword of Brahma. Bhishma once told the story of this sword to Pandava prince Nakula. This sword was the primordial weapon created by the gods for the destruction of evil. The name of the sword was Asi, the personification and the primary energy behind all the weapons ever created.  As per Bhishma, the constellation under which the sword was born is called Krittika, Agni is its deity, Rohini is its gotra, Rudra is its high preceptor, and whoever holds this weapon obtains victory for sure. Nakula received this sword from Guru Drona. Drona received Brahmashira from Guru Agnivesha and he was also the student of Sage Bharadwaja.

Role in the Kurukshetra War
 

Dronacharya had been the preceptor of most kings involved in the Kurukshetra War on both sides. Dronacharya strongly condemned Duryodhana exiling the Pandavas, as well as the Kauravas' general abuse towards the Pandavas. But being a servant of Hastinapura, Dronacharya was duty-bound to fight for the Kauravas, and thus against his favorite Pandavas. After the fall of Bhishma on the 10th day, he became the Chief Commander of the Kaurava army on the 11th day of war.

 
Duryodhana manages to convince Drona to try to end the war by capturing Yudhishthira. Though he killed hundreds and thousands of Pandava troops, Drona failed to capture Yudhishthira on the eleventh and twelfth days of the war, as Arjuna was always there to repel his advances.

Abhimanyu's killing

 
On the 13th day of the war, Dronacharya formed the Chakravyuha strategy to capture Yudhishtira, knowing that only Arjuna and Krishna would know how to penetrate it. The Trigartas were distracting Arjuna and Krishna into another part of the battlefield, allowing the main Kaurava army to surge through the Pandava ranks.

Unknown to many, Arjuna's young son Abhimanyu had the knowledge to penetrate the formation but did not know the way out. At the request of Yudhishthira, Abhimanyu agreed to lead the way for the Pandava army and was able to penetrate the formation. However, he was trapped when Jayadratha, the King of Sindhu, held the Pandava warriors who were following him, at bay. Abhimanyu did not know how to get out of the Chakravyuha, but embarked upon an all-out attack on the Kaurava army, killing tens of thousands of warriors single-handedly. Drona is impressed with Abhimanyu and praises him endlessly, earning the ire of Duryodhana. With his army facing decimation and spurred on by Duryodhana's criticisms, Drona asked the Kaurava warriors to simultaneously attack Abhimanyu, to strike down his horses and his charioteer and to disable his chariot from different angles. Left without support, Abhimanyu began fighting from the ground. Exhausted after his long and prodigious feats, Abhimanyu was eventually killed.

After that, several who fought against Abhimanyu were criticized for their murder, such as Bhurishrava, Drona and Karna.

Fourteenth Day
The devious murder of his son enraged Arjuna, who swore to kill Jayadratha the next day or immolate himself. Drona constructed 3 combined vyuhas to protect Jayadratha, first was the Shakata vyuha then was Padma Vyuha and last was the Srigantaka vyuha and at its rear was Jayadratha and stood at the head of the box formation or shakata vyuha
 
In the early part of the day, Arjuna and he duel, and Arjuna is unable to bypass his preceptor. With Krishna's prodding, Arjuna circumvents Drona. When Duryodhana rages at Drona, Drona replies and that he intends to capture Yudhishthira while Arjuna is away and would only hasten their victory. In a notable battle, Drona attempts to capture Yudhishthira but is stopped by Dhristadyumna. Drona severely wounds his friend's son, disarming him and forcing him to retreat. When he attempts to chase after Dhristadyumna, he is checked by Satyaki, who insults his teacher's teacher and issues a challenge. Their combat is described as fierce and despite being able to hold off Drona for several hours, Satyaki eventually tires and has to be rescued by the Upapandavas.
 
Later in the day, Yudhishthira sends Satyaki to aid Arjuna. When Satyaki comes upon Drona, he circumvents him, saying he must follow in his teacher's footsteps. When Yudhishthira later sends Bhima, Drona recounts what happened with Arjuna and Satyaki, and hence makes sure he does not allow Bhima also to circumvent him. Angrily rebuking him, Bhima shatters Drona's chariot with his mace. Drona takes up another chariot, only for Bhima to smash that one as well. In total, Bhima smashes eight of Drona's chariots and is able to bypass his guru.

Death 

On the 14th night of the Mahabharata war, Drona is instigated by Duryodhana's remarks of being a traitor as he was not able to protect Jaidrath. Sensing his end is near, he used the Brahmastra against the common Pandava soldiers. At that moment, all the Sapta Ṛṣis appeared on the sky and requested Drona to retract this ultimate weapon used on ordinary soldiers. Dronacharya obeyed, retracting the weapon. The rishis continue and berate Drona for violating the rules of war, criticizing him for using divine weapons so indiscriminately. Drona reiterates that he is sworn to do all he can to protect Hastinapur, and that, moreover, he wants to do so for all that Dhritarashtra has given him.
 
On the 15th day, Drona kills many Pandava soldiers, including Virat in arrow-play and Drupada in a sword fight. Lamenting the deterioration of their friendship, Drona pays his respect to Drupada's corpse. Drona and his son Ashwatthama unleashed havoc upon the entire Pandava army that day.
 
Knowing it would be impossible to defeat an armed Drona and his son Ashwatthama that day, Krishna suggested the Pandavas a plan to disarm their teacher. His idea was that Bhima first kill an elephant named Ashwatthama, and then claim to Dronacharya that he has killed Dronacharya's son with the same name while keeping Ashwatthama the real son of Drona busy in battle somewhere else far from his father so that he can't save his father and ruin their plan. After killing the elephant, Bhima loudly proclaimed that he had killed "Ashwatthama". Disbelieving his claim, Drona approached Yudhishthira, knowing of Yudhishthira's firm adherence to Dharma and honesty. When Dronacharya asked for the truth, Yudhishthira responded with the cryptic "Ashwatthama is dead. But the elephant and not your son." Krishna also knew that it would be impossible for Yudhishthira to lie outright. So under his instructions, the other warriors blew trumpets and conchs, raising a tumultuous noise in such a way that Dronacharya only heard that "Ashwatthama was dead", and could not hear the latter part of Yudhishthira's reply. In other versions of the story, it is told that: Yudhishthira was just not loud enough in purpose when he spoke the latter part of his words, or that Drona, in shock and grief, simply could not process the latter part of Yudhishthira's statement.

 
Then Drona descended from his chariot, laid down his arms and sat on the ground in meditation to find his son's soul. Pandavas wanted to use this opportunity to arrest him, but enraged by the death of his father and several Panchala warriors, Dhrishtadyumna took this opportunity and beheads him, in a gross violation of the rules of war. Krishna justified the act by pointing to Drona's role in killing of Abhimanyu.

Analysis and modern assessment
Drona was somewhat parallel to Bhishma both in martial powers, and, compelled by the refuge they had given him, in his unwavering commitment to fighting for Hastinapur irrespective of who the ruler was and whether or not the cause was just. Like Bhishma, Drona is criticized for his pride and conceit, siding with adharma despite knowing of and acknowledging the righteousness of the Pandava cause. Krishna criticized this reasoning as mere pride-Drona wanted to put his obligation to Hastinapur over dharma so that no one questioned his honor.

Dronacharya was criticized for many of his actions during the war:
 
 First, as a Brahmin, and secondly, as the princes' teacher, he should have removed himself from the battlefield.	
 Dronacharya tried to use Brahmastra, celestial powerful weapons against the Pandavas' common foot-soldiers. But when Lord Krishna stopped him, Drona argued that his first obligation was to defeating his enemy and defending his soldiers, by whatever means he possessed.

Droncharya's overarching actions during the war are portrayed differently. When he became commander-in-chief, the rules of war were averted. Divine weapons were used against ordinary soldiers, war continued throughout the night, warriors no longer engaged each other one-on-one, etc. Specifically, he was willing to try to end the war by capturing Yudhishthira, while Karna was not, as he considered it lacking honor. In other versions, Drona's differences in strategy are shown as a difference in philosophy- Drona believed, that as the commander-in-chief of the Kaurava army, his goal was to ensure the protection of his soldiers through any means necessary.

In popular culture 
The acharya remains a revered figure in Hindu history, and a pillar of the Indian tradition of respecting one's teacher as an equal not only of parents, but even of God. The Government of India annually awards the Dronacharya Award for excellence in sports tutelage to the best sports teachers and coaches in India.

It is believed that the city of Gurgaon was founded as "Guru Gram" by Dronacharya on land given to him by Dhritarashtra, the king of Hastinapura in recognition of his teachings of martial arts to the princes, and the 'Dronacharya Tank', still exists within the Gurgaon city, along with a village called Gurgaon. Indian Government (Haryana), on 12 April 2016 decided to reinstate and change the name of Gurgaon to Gurugram.

See also

Hindu mythology
Hinduism
Wars of Hindu Mythology
Historicity of the Mahabharata

References

Sources
 
 The Story of Drona - the Teacher of Kauravas and Pandavas
 Supereme Court of India on Dronacharya: http://articles.timesofindia.indiatimes.com/2011-01-06/india/28378711_1_tribals-sc-bench-dronacharya 

Hindu saints
Characters in the Mahabharata